Vidya Shah is an Indian singer, musician, social activist and writer.

Early life
Shah's family had a significant musical background. With her fondness for and exposure to the North Indian style of classical music, she decided to make a foray into this style of vocal music. She has trained under music icon Shubha Mudgal in Khayal Gayaki and with Shanti Hiranand in Thumri, Dadra and Ghazal. Shah is trained in classical singing.

Career

Vidya Shah had begun her journey into the world of music at the age of 12 when she started learning South Indian Classical music and as a young Carnatic vocalist, had several concerts to her credit.

Trained initially in Carnatic music, Vidya Shah later received guidance in Khayal from Shubha Mudgal and learnt thumri, dadra and ghazal gayaki from Shanti Hiranand. During her training in Khyal Gayaki under the guidance of her Guru she gained a rich repertoire of Sufi and Bhakti Music. 
She also experimented with tribal music during a short stint of her stay in a tribal area in Western Madhya Pradesh and developed a flair for folk music.

Besides TV, radio, independent films and documentaries, she has performed on various National and International forums and has worked with International Labels. She has to her credits albums like – Anja (Album Realize), "Far From Home" (Album Medieval Punditz).
Her international platforms include Humboldt Forum, the Max Planck Institute in Berlin, Kala Utsav in Singapore, ICCR, in Trinidad and Tobago. In her concert "The Last Mughal" she performed with William Dalrymple. In 2009, she directed a two-day exhibition and music concert 'Women on Record', celebrating Music of women in the Gramophone era, in which she paid a tribute to the iconic female voices of gramophone era by performing their music. In 2014, Shah was the director of Women on Record.
A recipient of the Pro Helvetia Residency in 2010, Shah is also a writer and lyricist, and serves as a member of cultural committee of South Asia Foundation.

Social Work
She started working on social issues in January 1991 with Programme Fellow, Indo-German Social Service Program (IGSSS). Later she worked as an activist with Khedut Mazdoor Chetna Sanghatan (Rights based Trade Union for Agricultural Laborers) Jhabua District in Madhya Pradesh, India. She has been Research Officer with National AIDS Control Organisation (NACO).

She was founder member of Paridhi Research – Rights based women's organisation working on reproductive and sexual health with focus on birth control methods. She has been consultant with Centre for Development Studies, University of Wales, DFID, UK, UNIFEM, UNDP and HIV and Development Office, South and South West Asia for Trafficking and Vulnerability of Women and Girls to HIV/AIDS in India, Nepal and Bangladesh for the United Nations Research Institute of Social Development (UNRISD). She was Programme Co-ordinator with Naz Foundation (India) Trust. She was Director Education in Breakthrough (A Human Rights Organization) and now she serves as a Program Director at her husband's organisation Centre for Media and Alternative Communication CMAC.

Personal life
Vidya Shah is married to designer-photographer Parthiv Shah of ahmedabad.  They have a son Anant and daughter Antara.

Publications
  The Challenge of Changing values in Indian Culture: The case of Music; Presented at a Seminar organised by INTACH and Nakshband Educational Trust, IIC, 15 March, New Delhi Published in the South Asia Foundation Quarterly, April 2008;
  My Body is Not Mine: Book on the MSM community and rights violations across 6 states in India in collaboration with the Naz Foundation International, supported by DFID-PMO, November 2008
  Technical Paper on Gender, Vulnerabilities and HIV/AIDS for the UNIFEM South Asian Regional Office, New Delhi, January 2003
  Layers of Silence on Cross Border Trafficking and Women's vulnerability to HIV/AIDS, for the UNRISD Project on HIV and Development, 2002
  Brokered Livelihood: Debt, labour migration and Development in Tribal Western India in Labor Mobility in Rural Society, edited by Ben Rogaly and Arjaan de Haan, Published by Frank Cass    Publishers, UK, 2002
  Strength in Action: An Educators Guide on Preventing Domestic Violence, Breakthrough, 2004
  Talking HIV and Gender: Media and Messaging a Hand book; Women's Feature Service and UNIFEM, 2006

Discography
  Anja (Realize)
  Far From Home (Medieval Punditz)
  Ahsana Om Shanti (Six Degrees and Times Music).
  Har Mann Mein Aman for the National Commission for Women
  Ham se Zameen aur Aasman for the Ministry of Youth Affairs
  In January 2008 she released her latest CD, Hum Sab

Other projects
  Creative Consultant: "The World in the Balance" For PBS; Directed by Sarah Holt; Executive Producers Linda Harrar for WGBH; 2004
  Editor "People Plus" a book on the lives of HIV positive people, UNAIDS India, 2001
  Creative writer For Women's day campaign, 2001 for Ministry of Women and Child Welfare and Centre for Media and Alternative Communication (CMAC), March 2001
  Consultant in an advocacy project on "Peace and Equality" for National Commission for Women (NCW) December 1999
  Script and Research For a documentary film on Visual Anthropology, Doordarshan, National television channel, 1997–98
  Editor Paper on 'Lacquer work in India' for a UNESCO workshop in Myanmar, UNESCO, 1996 and Paper on 'Basic Education in India' for a UNESCO conference in India, UNESCO 1995

References

Further reading

  
  
  
  
  
 

Living people
Indian women classical musicians
Year of birth missing (living people)
Place of birth missing (living people)
Indian women composers
Writers from Madhya Pradesh
Indian women singer-songwriters
Indian singer-songwriters
Singers from Madhya Pradesh
Women musicians from Madhya Pradesh
20th-century Indian women singers
Women writers from Madhya Pradesh
Indian social sciences writers
Indian scientific authors
Social workers
20th-century Indian educational theorists
Indian women's rights activists
Indian women activists
Activists from Madhya Pradesh
21st-century Indian women singers
21st-century Indian singers
20th-century Indian singers
Social workers from Madhya Pradesh
Women educators from Madhya Pradesh
Educators from Madhya Pradesh
20th-century women writers
20th-century women educators